Doshi Dam  is a gravity dam located in Kanagawa Prefecture in Japan. The dam is used for power production. The catchment area of the dam is 112.5 km2. The dam impounds about 14  ha of land when full and can store 1525 thousand cubic meters of water. The construction of the dam was started on 1952 and completed in 1955.

See also
List of dams in Japan

References

Dams in Kanagawa Prefecture